Way to Your Heart is the debut album by Filipina R&B singer Kyla, released in 2000. The album consists of ten original OPM tracks mostly written by Mr. Arnie Mendaros. It includes the single Hanggang Ngayon which was nominated at MTV Pilipinas Awards in 2001 for Best Song and music video, Best Direction ( by Lyle Sacris), and Best Video. Kyla also won Best New Artist and Best Female Artist.

The music video also won the MTV Video Music Awards as MTV Southeast Asia 2001 Viewers’ Choice making Kyla the first and the only female artist to win the VMAs making  The album also won numerous award at the 16th Awit Awards for the single Hanggang Ngayon for Best Musical Arrangement, Best Performance By A New Female Recording Artist and Music Video Of The Year. Its first single Bring It On also won Best R&B song.

Track listing
All tracks were produced by Francis Guevarra, Jr. except for One More Try which was produced by Raymund Ryan and an entry to the 2000 Metro Pop Song Festival.

Personnel
Adapted from the album credits.
Chito Ilacad – executive producer
Francis Guevarra, Jr. – producer
Willie A. Monzon – art direction

Production
Melanie Calumpad (Kyla) – lead vocals, background vocals
Chito Miranda – background vocals
Ferdie Marquez – guitars, arranger
Arnel Layug – guitars

See also
 Kyla
 Kyla discography

References

2001 debut albums
Kyla albums